The Pablove Foundation is a US pediatric cancer nonprofit organization founded by Jo Ann Thrailkill and Jeff Castelaz. The organization is named for Thrailkill and Castelaz's son, Pablo Thrailkill Castelaz, who, in 2009, at six years old died from Wilms' tumor, a rare form of childhood cancer.

The mission of The Pablove Foundation is to invest in underfunded, cutting-edge pediatric cancer research, and through the arts, improve the lives of children who have cancer. They also provide information to parents of children with cancer.

Pablove Shutterbugs
The Shutterbug program provides cameras and lessons for cancer patients to learn photography. The programs include classes at the Massachusetts College of Art and Design.

The foundation sponsored some of the Shutterbug participants to capture the Golden Globes.

Events
 Pablove Across America

References

External links 
 Official site

Cancer charities in the United States
Pediatric cancers
Medical and health organizations based in California